Ocean County College (OCC) is a public community college in Ocean County, New Jersey. Its main campus is in Toms River. Other locations include the Southern Education Center in the Manahawkin section of Stafford Township and multiple off-campus sites throughout Ocean County.

History
In 1962, the state of New Jersey enacted the County College Act, empowering its counties to establish colleges and providing partial financial support for these colleges. Ocean County College was established by the Ocean County Board of Commissioners in January 1964 following a 1963 public referendum, and classes were first offered in the fall of 1964.

Academics
OCC offers Associate degrees in Science, Arts, and Applied Science. In 2019, these degrees were represented within a graduating class of 1,500 students with percentages of 54%, 36% and 10%, respectively. It also offers certificate studies in more than 40 different areas as well as a continuing education program. A total of 8,171 students were enrolled in the Fall semester of 2019.

Notable people
Faculty, staff and trustees
 Richard O'Meara, brigadier general, United States Army; instructor
 Leonard Lomell (1920–2011), United States Army ranger awarded the Silver Star for gallantry in action during World War II; former trustee
Alumni

 Mike Bucci (born 1972), professional wrestler
 Danny Clinch (born 1964), photographer and film director
 Virginia E. Haines (born 1946), politician; serves on the Ocean County Board of Chosen Freeholders; served in the New Jersey General Assembly, 1992-1994; executive director of the New Jersey Lottery, 1994-2002 
 Bruce Springsteen (born 1949), musician (non-graduate)

See also 

New Jersey County Colleges

References

External links
 Official website

Garden State Athletic Conference
Universities and colleges in Ocean County, New Jersey
New Jersey County Colleges
Two-year colleges in the United States
Educational institutions established in 1969
1969 establishments in New Jersey
NJCAA athletics
Toms River, New Jersey